Olearia decurrens, commonly known as the clammy daisy bush, is a species of flowering plant in the family Asteraceae and is endemic to arid, inland Australia. It is a glabrous, sticky, twiggy shrub with narrow egg-shaped to linear leaves sometimes with toothed edges, and white and yellow, daisy-like inflorescences.

Description 

Taxonomy
This species was first formally described in 1836 Swiss botanist Augustin Pyramus de Candolle who gave it the name Eurybia decurrens in the fifth volume of his Prodromus Systematis Naturalis Regni Vegetabilis, from material collected by Allan Cunningham in the vicinity of the Lachlan River. In 1867, George Bentham changed the name to Olearia decurrens in Flora Australiensis. The species name decurrens means "decurrent" and refers to the leaf base running down the stem.

Distribution and habitat
Olearia decurrens grows in mallee scrub and forest in arid areas and is found across inland Australia, from Dubbo and Brewarrina in New South Wales, westwards across inland Victoria and South Australia and into Western Australia where it is found in the Gascoyne, Gibson Desert, Great Victoria Desert and Murchison biogeographic regions.

Use in horticulture
Seldom seen in cultivation, O. decurrens is drought- and frost-tolerant. It grows best in sunny or part-shaded locations with good drainage. Pruning prevents plants from becoming too spindly or leggy.

References

decurrens
Asterales of Australia
Flora of New South Wales
Flora of Western Australia
Flora of South Australia
Flora of Victoria (Australia)
Taxa named by Augustin Pyramus de Candolle
Plants described in 1836